The Mananjary River is located in southern Madagascar, in the region of Vatovavy.

It drains to the eastern coast, into the Indian ocean. It serves as the southern edge of the territory known as Betsimisaraka.

Its mouth is situated in the city of Mananjary.

References 

Rivers of Vatovavy